The 2017 Meistriliiga (known as A. Le Coq Premium Liiga for sponsorship reasons) was the 27th season of the Meistriliiga, the top Estonian league for association football clubs, since its establishment in 1992. The season began on 3 March 2017 and concluded on 4 November 2017. FCI Tallinn began the season as defending champions of the 2016 season.

Flora won their 11th Meistriliiga title following a 2–0 home win over Tammeka on 28 October 2017.

Teams
A total of 10 teams contested the league, including 8 teams from the 2016 season. Tarvas were relegated after a winless season. Their spot was taken by Esiliiga champions Tulevik, making an immediate return after their 2015 relegation. 

In the relegation play-off Pärnu Linnameeskond successfully defended their league spot by defeating challengers Maardu Linnameeskond, but on 11 January 2017 Pärnu Linnameeskond, a union of football clubs from Pärnu, broke up. Vaprus, one of the three clubs that had formed Linnameeskond, took over the league spot.

Defending champions Infonet underwent a name change due to the UEFA restrictions regarding sponsorship names and became FCI Tallinn.

Venues

Personnel and kits

Managerial changes

League table

Results
Each team plays every opponent four times, twice at home and twice away. A total of 180 matches will be played, with 36 matches played by each team.

First half of season

Second half of season

Season statistics

Top scorers

Top assists

Hat-tricks

4 Player scored 4 goals; 6 Player scored 6 goals; (H) – Home ; (A) – Away

Awards

Monthly awards

Player of the Round

Meistriliiga Player of the Year
Rauno Sappinen was named Meistriliiga Player of the Year.

Goal of the Year
Viktor Plotnikov's goal against FCI Tallinn was chosen Goal of the Year.

See also
 2016–17 Estonian Cup
 2017–18 Estonian Cup
 2017 Esiliiga
 2017 Esiliiga B

References

External links
Official website

 
 

Meistriliiga seasons
1
Estonia
Estonia